Events from the year 1885 in the United States.

Incumbents

Federal Government 
 President: Chester A. Arthur (R-New York) (until March 4), Grover Cleveland (D-New York) (starting March 4)
 Vice President:
 until March 4: vacant
 March 4–November 25: Thomas A. Hendricks (D-Indiana)
 starting November 25: vacant
 Chief Justice: Morrison Waite (Ohio)
 Speaker of the House of Representatives: John G. Carlisle (D-Kentucky)
 Congress: 48th (until March 4), 49th (starting March 4)

Events

January–March
 February 9 – The first Japanese arrive in Hawaii.
 February 16 – Charles Dow publishes the first edition of the Dow Jones Industrial Average. The index stands at a level of 62.76, and represents the dollar average of 14 stocks: 12 railroads and two leading American industries.
 February 18 – Mark Twain publishes Adventures of Huckleberry Finn in the United States.
 February 21 – United States President Chester A. Arthur dedicates the Washington Monument.
 March 3 – A subsidiary of the American Bell Telephone Company, American Telephone and Telegraph (AT&T), is incorporated in New York.
 March 4 – Grover Cleveland is sworn in as the 22nd President of the United States, and Thomas A. Hendricks is sworn in as Vice President of the United States.

April–June
 April 30
 A bill is signed in the New York State legislature forming the Niagara Falls State Park.
 Boston Pops Orchestra is formed.
 May – The Depression of 1882–85 ends.
 June 17 – The Statue of Liberty arrives in New York Harbor.

July–September
 July 11 – San Diego Building and Loan Association founded, predecessor of Great American Bank.
 July 14 – Sarah E. Goode is the first female African-American to apply for and receive a patent, for the invention of the hideaway bed.
 July 23 – Former President and Civil War general Ulysses S. Grant dies in Mount McGregor, New York.
 August 25 – Author Laura Ingalls Wilder marries Almanzo Wilder.
 September 2 – The Rock Springs massacre occurs in Rock Springs, Wyoming; 150 white miners attack their Chinese coworkers, killing 28, wounding 15, and forcing several hundred more out of town.
 September 8 – Saint Thomas Academy is founded in Minnesota.

October–December
 October 13 – The Georgia Institute of Technology is established in Atlanta, Georgia as the Georgia School of Technology.
 November 25 – Vice President Thomas A. Hendricks dies in office.
 December 1 – The U.S. Patent Office acknowledges this date as the day Dr Pepper is served for the very first time; the exact date of Dr Pepper's invention is unknown.

Undated
 The first skyscraper (the Home Insurance Building) is built in Chicago, Illinois, USA (10 floors).
 Michigan Technological University (originally Michigan Mining School) opens its doors for the first time in what is to become the Houghton County Fire Hall.
 Camp Dudley, the oldest continually running boys' camp in America, is founded.

Ongoing
 Gilded Age (1869–c. 1896)
 Depression of 1882–85 (1882–1885)

Sport 
August 29 – John L. Sullivan becomes First World Heavyweight Boxing Champion.
September 30 – The Chicago White Stockings clinch their Third National League pennant with a 2–1 win over the New York Giants.

Births
 January 7 – Edwin Swatek, swimmer and water polo player (died 1966)
 January 11 – Alice Paul, suffragist (died 1977)
 January 15 – Grover Lowdermilk, baseball player (died 1968)
 January 27
 Jerome Kern, musical theater composer (died 1945)
 Harry Ruby, musician, composer and writer (died 1974)
 February 7 – Sinclair Lewis fiction writer, recipient of Nobel Prize in Literature in 1930 (died 1951 in Italy)
 February 13 – Bess Truman, First Lady of the United States, Second Lady of the United States (died 1982)
 February 17 – Steve Evans, baseball player (died 1943)
 February 18 – Richard S. Edwards, admiral (died 1956)
 March 6 – Ring Lardner, writer (died 1933)
 April 1 – Wallace Beery, actor (died 1949)
 April 7 – Bee Ho Gray, Wild West star, silent film actor and vaudeville performer (died 1951)
 April 13 – Vean Gregg, baseball player (died 1964)
 May 2
 Hedda Hopper, columnist (died 1966)
 Lee W. Stanley, cartoonist (died 1970)
 May 7 – George "Gabby" Hayes, Western film character actor (died 1969)
 May 14 – Ben J. Tarbutton, businessman and politician (died 1962)
 May 30 – Arthur E. Andersen, accountant (died 1947)
 June 29 – Andrew Tombes, comedian and character actor (died 1976)
 July 4 – Louis B. Mayer, film producer (died 1957)
 July 6 – Charles Wisner Barrell, writer (died 1974)
 July 10 – Mary O'Hara, author and screenwriter (died 1980)
 July 15 – Tom Kennedy, actor (died 1965)
 July 22 – John Thomas Kennedy, general and Medal Honour recipient (died 1969)
 August 15 – Edna Ferber, novelist, short story writer, and playwright (died 1968)
 September 7 – Elinor Wylie (Elinor Morton Hoyt), poet and novelist (died 1928)
 September 11 – Julian C. Smith, general (died 1975)
 September 15 – James P. Boyle, politician (died 1939)
 September 22 – George Gaul, actor (died 1939)
 October 3 – Sophie Treadwell, dramatist and journalist (died 1970)
 October 9 – Raymond DeWalt, inventor and businessman (died 1961) 
 October 30 – Ezra Pound, poet (died 1972 in Italy)
 November 1 – Edgar J. Kaufmann, merchant and patron of Fallingwater (died 1955)
 November 11 – George S. Patton, General (died 1945 in Heidelberg, Germany)
 November 28 – John Willard, playwright and actor (d. 1942)
 December 2 – George Minot, physiologist, recipient of Nobel Prize in Physiology or Medicine in 1934 (died 1950)
 December 6 – Ernest Palmer, cinematographer (died 1978)
 December 10 – Elizabeth Baker, economist and academic (died 1973) 
 December 19 – King Oliver, jazz cornet player and bandleader (died 1938)
 December 26 – Bazoline Estelle Usher, African American educator (died 1992)

Full date unknown
Eugene Prussing, lawyer and philanthropist

Deaths
 January 13 – Schuyler Colfax, 17th Vice President of the United States from 1869 to 1873 (born 1823)
 January 24 – Martin Delany, African American abolitionist, journalist and physician (born 1812)
 February 12 – Alexandre Mouton, U.S. Senator from Louisiana from 1843 to 1846 (born 1804)
 March 17 – Susan Warner (pseudonym Elizabeth Weatherell), religious and children's writer (born 1819)
 May 4 – Irvin McDowell, Union Army officer known for defeat in  the First Battle of Bull Run (born 1818)
 May 17 – Jonathan Young, U.S. Navy commodore (born 1826)
 May 19 – Robert Emmet Odlum, swimming instructor, dies as result of becoming the first person to jump from the Brooklyn Bridge (born 1851)
 May 20 – Frederick Theodore Frelinghuysen, 29th United States Secretary of State (born 1817)
 July 23 – Ulysses S. Grant, 18th President of the United States from 1869 to 1877 (born 1822)
 August 10 – James W. Marshall, contractor, builder of Sutter's Mill (born 1810)
 September 3 – William M. Gwin, U.S. Senator from California from 1850 to 1855 and from 1857 to 1861 (born 1805)
 October 5 – Thomas C. Durant, railroad financier (born 1820)
 October 29 – George B. McClellan, soldier, civil engineer, railroad executive and politician (born 1826)
 November 25 – Thomas A. Hendricks, 21st Vice President of the United States from March to November 1885 (born 1819)
 December 8 – William Henry Vanderbilt, entrepreneur (born 1821)
 December 21 –  George S Patton, General (born 1885)
 December 13 – Benjamin Gratz Brown, politician (born 1826)
 December 15 – Robert Toombs, U.S. Senator from Georgia from 1853 to 1861 (born 1810)
 December 29 – James E. Bailey, U.S. Senator from Tennessee from 1877 to 1881 (born 1821)

See also
Timeline of United States history (1860–1899)

References

External links
 

 
1880s in the United States
United States
United States
Years of the 19th century in the United States